Abbas Ardehali is an Iranian-American cardiothoracic surgeon. He is the surgical director of UCLA's Heart, Lung, and Heart-Lung Transplant programs, and was the principal investigator behind technology that allows for the transportation of a breathing human heart or lung for an extended period of time.

Early life and education 
Abbas Ardehali was born in Tehran, Iran and moved to the United States at age sixteen. After completing school, he attended Rutgers University, where he received his Bachelors of Science Degree. He then went on to complete his MD at Emory University School of Medicine in 1986. Originally pursuing a career in Cardiology, he completed his Internal Medicine internship (1986-1987) and residency (1987-1989) at the UC San Francisco School of Medicine. He additionally completed 1 year of a Cardiology fellowship at the UC San Francisco School of Medicine in 1990 before changing career paths.

Career
Ardehali decided to take up Cardiothoracic surgery as a profession. He completed his surgical internship (1990-1991), surgical residency (1991-1995), and Thoracic surgical residency (1995-1997) at UCLA School of Medicine.

He now serves as the surgical director of UCLA's Heart and Lung Transplant program. He is the William E. Connor Chair in Cardiothoracic Transplantation, and a Professor of Surgery and Medicine at UCLA School of Medicine, Division of Cardiothoracic surgery. The program has been one of the largest lung transplant programs on the west coast.

Ardehali was involved developing technology that allows for transporting a breathing human heart or lung for an extended period of time. Abbas Ardehali was the first surgeon in the United States to perform a 'breathing lung' transplant.

Awards 
 2018, Los Angeles Magazine Top Doctors (Cardiac Surgery)
 2017, Ellis Island Medal of Honor by the National Ethnic Coalition of Organizations
 2013, Breath of Life Innovation Award from the Cystic Fibrosis Foundation
 2007-2016, Best Doctors in America 
 2005, Scleroderma Foundation Spirit of Leadership Award, Los Angeles
 2008-2013, Vitals Patient's Choice Award
 2012, Resolution of Commendation by the California State Assembly

Personal life
He and his wife live with their two daughters in Los Angeles, California. Abbas Ardehali served as a Trustee of the Brentwood School from 2013-2015.

Selected publications
Dr. Abbas Ardehali has authored multiple book chapters, published more than 100 peer-reviewed publications, and currently holds numerous patents that are issued or filed.
 2016, Co-authored a textbook, "Khonsari’s Cardiac Surgery: Safeguards and Pitfalls in Operative Technique"
 Wickii Vigneswaran, Edward Garrity and John Odell, Lung Transplantation: Principles and Practice, 2016; Chapter 25: Lung Transplantation for Connective Tissue Disorders 
 Parsons P, Wiener-Kronish, J, Ardehali A. Critical Care Secrets, Fifth Edition, 2012. 
 Kobashigawa JA, Patel JK, Kittleson MM, Kawano MA, Kiyosaki KK, Davis SN, Moriguchi JD, Reed EF, Ardehali AA. The long-term outcome of treated sensitized patients who undergo heart transplantation. Clin Transplant. 2011 Jan-Feb;25(1):E61-7. 
 Kobashigawa JA, Laks H, Wu G, Patel J, Moriguchi J, Hamilton M, Fonarow G, Fishbein M, Ardehali A. The University of California at Los Angeles heart transplantation experience. Clinical Transplant 2005;173-85. 
 Whiting D, Ardehali, A. Animal Models for Xenotransplantation. Handbook of Laboratory Animal Science, Second Edition: Animal Models, Volume II, 2003 
 Ardehali A, Laks H, Fyfe AI. Gene transfer and intrathoracic transplantation, in Cooper DKC (ed): Transplantation and Replacement of Thoracic Organs, Second Edition, 1996

See also
 List of Iranian Americans

References 

Living people
1959 births
American cardiac surgeons
People from Tehran